Youssef Moustaïd (born 21 August 1976) is a French former professional footballer who played as a midfielder. Between 1994 and 2003, he played in Ligue 1 and Ligue 2 for AS Nancy.

References
 
 

1976 births
Living people
Sportspeople from Nancy, France
French footballers
Association football midfielders
AS Nancy Lorraine players
US Raon-l'Étape players
Ligue 1 players
US Marseille Endoume players
Footballers from Grand Est